Ganiesh a/l Gunasegaran (born 26 June 1995) is a Malaysian footballer who plays for Petaling Jaya City FC as a defender.

References

External links
 

1995 births
Living people
Malaysian footballers
Malaysian people of Indian descent
Association football defenders
Malaysia Super League players
PKNP FC players
Petaling Jaya City FC players